Setaria dielsii, commonly known as Diels' pigeon grass, is a species of grass in the family Poaceae native to Australia.

Description
It is an annual grass that grows in tufts from 20 to 130 centimetres high. It has green flowers that occur in an open panicle.<ref name="FloraBase 606">{{FloraBase | name = '"Setaria dielsii R.A.W.Herrm. | id = 606}}</ref>

Taxonomy
This species was first published by Rudolf Albert Wolfgang Herrmann in 1910. Its only synonym is Setaria buchananii'', published by Albert Spear Hitchcock in 1927.

Distribution and habitat
It occurs in Western Australia and the Northern Territory.

References

External links

dielsii
Bunchgrasses of Australasia
Poales of Australia
Angiosperms of Western Australia
Flora of the Northern Territory
Taxa named by A. S. Hitchcock